This is a directory of properties and districts listed on the National Register of Historic Places in Wyoming. There are more than 500 listed sites in Wyoming. Each of the 23 counties in Wyoming has at least four listings on the National Register.

Current listings by county

The following are approximate tallies of current listings in Wyoming on the National Register of Historic Places. These counts are based on entries in the National Register Information Database as of April 24, 2008 and new weekly listings posted since then on the National Register of Historic Places web site. There are frequent additions to the listings and occasional delistings, and the counts here are not official. Also, the counts in this table exclude boundary increase and decrease listings which modify the area covered by an existing property or district and which carry a separate National Register reference number.

See also

List of National Historic Landmarks in Wyoming
List of bridges on the National Register of Historic Places in Wyoming

References

 
Wyoming